The Algerian Women's Super Cup is a women's association football competition in Algeria. pitting regional teams against each other.  It was established in 2016. It is the women's equivalent of the Algerian Super Cup for men. The winner of the 2016 edition was FC Constantine.

Finals

Most successful clubs

See also 
 Algerian Women's Championship
 Algerian Women's League Cup
 Algerian Women's Cup

References

External links 
 Mobilis partenaire officiel de la 1re édition de la Super Coupe féminine - Liberté

Women's football competitions in Algeria
Recurring sporting  events established in 2016
2016 establishments in Algeria